Malkiya may refer to:

Malkia, a kibbutz in northern Israel
Malkiya, Bahrain
Malkiya Club, a football club from the town in Bahrain
Al-Malikiyah, a town in Syria
al-Malkiyya, a depopulated Palestinian village in Israel